Andrei Nezezon (born 1975 in Satu Mare) is a retired Romanian aerobic gymnast. He had a successful career winning four world championships medals (two gold, one silver, and one bronze) 
After his retirement in 1997 he went to Germany where he works as a gymnastics coach at the TKH gymnastics club in Hanover.

References

External links
 Andrei Nezezon

1975 births
Sportspeople from Satu Mare
Romanian aerobic gymnasts
Male aerobic gymnasts
Living people
Medalists at the Aerobic Gymnastics World Championships